Alto Rendimiento Tuzo is a Mexican football club in Pachuca, Hidalgo, currently placed in the Segunda División de México Liga Nuevos Talentos. The club is not eligible for promotion because it is affiliated with Mexican Liga Bancomer MX club C.F. Pachuca with whom they share the same stadium for training.

Current squad

Honors
Segunda División de México (1) : Apertura 2008

External links
Tercera divicion
Home Page

Footnotes

Football clubs in Hidalgo (state)
1993 establishments in Mexico